Magomedgaji Nurov, sometimes written as Magomedgadzhi Nurov (Магомедгаџи Омардибирович Нуров, born 19 April 1993) is a Russian-Macedonian freestyle wrestler. He won one of the bronze medals in the men's 97 kg event at the 2019 World Wrestling Championships held in Nur-Sultan, Kazakhstan. He represented North Macedonia at the 2020 Summer Olympics in Tokyo, Japan.

Career 

He won the gold medal in the men's freestyle 97 kg event at the 2018 Mediterranean Games held in Tarragona, Spain.

In 2019, he competed in the men's freestyle 97 kg event at the European Games held in Minsk, Belarus. He lost his bronze medal match against Aliaksandr Hushtyn of Belarus.

He won the gold medal in the men's freestyle 97 kg event at the 2022 Mediterranean Games held in Oran, Algeria. He competed in the 97kg event at the 2022 World Wrestling Championships held in Belgrade, Serbia.

Achievements

References

External links 
 

Living people
1993 births
Place of birth missing (living people)
Macedonian male sport wrestlers
World Wrestling Championships medalists
Mediterranean Games medalists in wrestling
Mediterranean Games gold medalists for North Macedonia
Competitors at the 2018 Mediterranean Games
Competitors at the 2022 Mediterranean Games
Wrestlers at the 2019 European Games
European Games competitors for North Macedonia
Wrestlers at the 2020 Summer Olympics
Olympic wrestlers of North Macedonia
21st-century Macedonian people